Guru Tegh Bahadur Nagar (GTB Nagar), formerly known as Koliwada, is a neighbourhood in Sion, Mumbai, named after Sri Guru Tegh Bahadur Ji, the ninth Guru of Sikhism.

Originally home to Mumbai's indigenous Koli community, it is also known as Koliwada. A colony was constructed for the rehabilitation of Sikh and Hindu refugees who came from North West Frontier Province of Pakistan after the Partition of India

Today, many of the buildings and tenements originally constructed for the refugees are in a  dilapidated state, and are awaiting demolition and redevelopment.

The neighborhood's residents, however, have been protesting the order to vacate the property and its subsequent demolition because they are looking for a different rental and redevelopment arrangement.

GTB Nagar, today, is renowned for its unique culture and cuisine, which has evolved over the years as an amalgamation of the influences of the indigenous Koli community and the Punjabi Hindu and Sikh migrants.

Location
Guru Tegh Bahadur Nagar is in South Central Mumbai, with the nearest railway station being Guru Tegh Bahadur Nagar railway station on the Harbour Line of the Mumbai Suburban Railway.

Guru Tegh Bahadur Nagar has a college started by the Sikh community of this area called Guru Nanak College of Arts, Science & Commerce affiliated to Mumbai University.

The Nearest Hospitals are Lokmanya Tilak Municipal General Hospital (Sion), Mata Laxmi Hospital and AntopHill Hospital.

GTB Nagar also consists of government colonies named as CGHS Colony. This colony consist of 7 sectors 1–7 which are allocated to different Central Government employees from different fields (CPWD, dockyard, Indian navy etc).

There are other areas such as Pratiksha Nagar, Makawadi, Indira Nagar, Antophill etc.

Religion
GTB Nagar and its surrounding area has seven gurdwaras, notable among which is the Gurdwara Dashmesh Darbar; and temples which were built for the worship of Punjabi Hindus notable one being Shree Geeta Bhavan Hari Mandir.

The gurdwaras are known for their charitable trusts and community service initiatives, particularly for their responsiveness during natural calamities and the langar meals served throughout the day.

Schools and colleges

Schools 

 Sion Koliwada Municipal School
 Guru Nanak High School (Hindi & English Medium)
 Shree Sanatan Dharam High School
 Chetumal Bhoolchand Murlidhar (C.B.M.) High School
 A.M. Kewalramani Premier High School – also known as Trinity High School

Colleges 
 Guru Nanak College of Arts, Science and Commerce
 Shree Sanatan Dharam Junior College

Notable former residents
 Akshay Kumar
 Johny Lever
 Veeru Devgan
 Prithviraj Kapoor
 Aman baljit singh
 Kuldeep Singh (music director)

See also
Koli People
King Mandhata

References 

Neighbourhoods in Mumbai